Caleb Gaylard (born 25 September 1990) is a New Zealand cricketer. He played in one first-class match for Central Districts in 2014.

See also
 List of Central Districts representative cricketers

References

External links
 

1990 births
Living people
New Zealand cricketers
Central Districts cricketers
Cricketers from Wellington City